Last Emperor may refer to:
Last Roman Emperor, figure in medieval eschatology
Payitaht: Abdülhamid, English: The Last Emperor, a Turkish historical television drama series
Puyi (1906–1967), the last emperor of China
The Last Emperor, 1987 film about the life of Puyi
The Last Emperor (album), soundtrack album for the 1987 film
The Last Emperor (rapper) (born 1972), recording name of American hip-hop artist Jamal Gray
Valentino: The Last Emperor, 2009 documentary film about the life of Italian fashion designer Valentino Garavani

See also
Last Roman Emperor (disambiguation)